Isaac White House, also known as the Thomas White House, was a historic home located near Bethel, Perquimans County, North Carolina.   It was built about 1716, and was a two-story, three bay, hall-and-parlor plan frame house with semi-engaged, two-tier porch.  It had a side gable roof, and featured flanking gable end brick chimneys with steep double shoulders.  The house has been moved to 612 Holiday Island Road in Hertford NC, and is being restored by Down East Preservation and Old Town Wood Floors.

The house was added to the National Register of Historic Places in 1979.

References

External links

Historic American Buildings Survey in North Carolina
Houses on the National Register of Historic Places in North Carolina
Houses completed in 1716
Houses in Perquimans County, North Carolina
National Register of Historic Places in Perquimans County, North Carolina
1716 establishments in the Thirteen Colonies